"The Last DJ" is the title of a song written by Tom Petty and recorded by American rock band Tom Petty and the Heartbreakers. It was released in September 2002 as the lead single from their album of the same name. The song had moderate success, reaching number 22 on Billboard's Mainstream Rock Tracks list in 2002.

Background and writing
Petty told Mojo magazine that, in the song, "Radio was just a metaphor. ‘The Last DJ’ was really about losing our moral compass, our moral center."

Petty told Jim DeRogatis that the song is a story "about a D.J. in Jacksonville, Florida, who became so frustrated with his inability to play what he wants that he moves to Mexico and gets his freedom back. The song is sung by a narrator who's a fan of this D.J."

Banning
The song was banned by many stations owned by Clear Channel Communications for being "anti-radio." "I was elated when my song was banned," Petty told Billboard. "I remember when the radio meant something. We enjoyed the people who were on it, even if we hated them. They had personalities. They were people of taste, who we trusted. And I see that vanishing."

Critical reception
Billboard'''s Chuck Taylor called it "the most inspiring song in years from a man who has pretty much seen it all."

In popular culture
In the Simpsons'' episode "How I Spent My Strummer Vacation", Homer receives songwriting lessons from Tom Petty. In the original airing, "The Last DJ" can be heard playing on a radio in the final scene. The song was changed for syndication.

Charts

References

External links
Tom Petty & The Heartbreakers: The Last DJ (2002): Reviews at Metacritic.

Tom Petty songs
Songs written by Tom Petty
2002 singles
2002 songs
Warner Records singles
Songs about radio